Eduardo Laurindo da Silva (born 30 September 1944) is a former Portuguese footballer who played as a forward. He spent most of his career with Belenenses.

Career
Laurindo made his professional debut on 12 May 1968 for Belenenses in a 4-0 win over Sporting.

International career
Laurindo was born in Portugal to Angolan parents. His sole appearance for the Portugal national football team was in a friendly 0-0 tie with Mexico on 6 April 1969.

Personal life
Laurindo is the father of Angola international footballer Mauro, who also played for Belenenses. He sold all he had and left Portugal for Angola, with his sons Mauro and Hector, to help rebuild the country.

References

External links 
 
 
 

1944 births
Living people
Portuguese footballers
Portugal international footballers
Portuguese sportspeople of Angolan descent
Association football forwards
Primeira Liga players
C.F. Os Belenenses players
FC Porto players
S.C. Beira-Mar players